Cryolite (Na3AlF6, sodium hexafluoroaluminate) is an uncommon mineral identified with the once-large deposit at Ivittuut on the west coast of Greenland, mined commercially until 1987.

History
Cryolite was first described in 1798 by Danish veterinarian and physician Peder Christian Abildgaard (1740–1801); it was obtained from a deposit of it in Ivigtut (old spelling) and nearby Arsuk Fjord, Southwest Greenland. The name is derived from the Greek language words κρύος (cryos) = frost, and λίθος (lithos) = stone.  The Pennsylvania Salt Manufacturing Company used large amounts of cryolite to make caustic soda and fluorine compounds, including hydrofluoric acid at its Natrona, Pennsylvania, works, and at its integrated chemical plant in Cornwells Heights, Pennsylvania, during the 19th and 20th centuries.

It was historically used as an ore of aluminium and later in the electrolytic processing of the aluminium-rich oxide ore bauxite (itself a combination of aluminium oxide minerals such as gibbsite, boehmite and diaspore). The difficulty of separating aluminium from oxygen in the oxide ores was overcome by the use of cryolite as a flux to dissolve the oxide mineral(s). Pure cryolite itself melts at 1012 °C (1285 K), and it can dissolve the aluminium oxides sufficiently well to allow easy extraction of the aluminium by electrolysis. Substantial energy is still needed for both heating the materials and the electrolysis, but it is much more energy-efficient than melting the oxides themselves. As natural cryolite is now too rare to be used for this purpose, synthetic sodium aluminium fluoride is produced from the common mineral fluorite.

Source locations

Besides Ivittuut, on the west coast of Greenland where cryolite was once found in commercial quantities, small deposits of cryolite have also been reported in some areas of Spain, at the foot of Pikes Peak in Colorado, Francon Quarry near Montreal in Quebec, Canada and also in Miask, Russia.

Uses
Molten cryolite is used as a solvent for aluminium oxide (Al2O3) in the Hall–Héroult process, used in the refining of aluminium. It decreases the melting point of aluminium oxide from 2000 to 2500 °C to 900–1000 °C, and increases its conductivity thus making the extraction of aluminium more economical.

Cryolite is used as an insecticide and a pesticide. It is also used to give fireworks a yellow color.

Physical properties

Cryolite occurs as glassy, colorless, white-reddish to gray-black prismatic monoclinic crystals. It has a Mohs hardness of 2.5 to 3 and a specific gravity of about 2.95 to 3.0. It is translucent to transparent with a very low refractive index of about 1.34, which is very close to that of water; thus if immersed in water, cryolite becomes essentially invisible.

References

Phase transitions and volumetric properties of cryolite, Na3AlF6: Differential thermal analysis to 100 MPa; American Mineralogist; January 2006; v. 91; no. 1; p. 97-103;  

Aluminium minerals
History of Greenland
Natural history of Greenland
Pyrotechnic colorants
Sodium minerals
Monoclinic minerals
Minerals in space group 14
Fluorine minerals
Inorganic insecticides
Pesticides